Monica Calhoun (born July 29, 1971) is an American film and television actress. Calhoun is best known for her roles in the films Bagdad Cafe, The Players Club, The Salon, The Best Man, and its sequel The Best Man Holiday. Calhoun has been nominated for an Emmy Award and one NAACP Image Award.

Biography

Early life and education
Born Lorine Monica Patrice Calhoun in Philadelphia, Pennsylvania, Calhoun was the first of two children born to Lorine W. Calhoun. She moved to California in the late 1970s, and began acting while in sixth grade. Calhoun attended the Los Angeles County High School for the Arts.

Career
Calhoun made her acting debut in the 1985 TV film Children of the Night as Wanda. She portrayed Phyllis, the daughter of CCH Pounder's character, in Bagdad Cafe (1987). Calhoun was the only actor in Bagdad Cafe to return for the television series, albeit the character's name was changed to Debbie. The televised adaptation lasted two seasons before being cancelled.

She portrayed Rebbie Jackson in the 1992 biopic miniseries The Jacksons: An American Dream. In 1993, she had a minor role in Sister Act 2: Back in the Habit and acted in the Disney Channel film The Ernest Green Story alongside Morris Chestnut. Calhoun received an Emmy Award nomination for her performance in the CBS Schoolbreak Special "Different Worlds:  A Story of Interracial Love" (1993). Calhoun co-starred with actor Flex Alexander in the short-lived series, Where I Live, and appeared in Pacific Station. 

Calhoun guest starred in several sitcoms including The Wayans Bros., A Different World and The Jamie Foxx Show, the latter as Jamie Foxx's sister. She appeared as Linda, one of the daughters of Donald Thornton in television film The Ditchdigger's Daughters (1997). Calhoun played the role of Ebony, a stripper, in Ice Cube's directorial debut The Players Club (1998). 

She appeared in the lead role, Reese Delaware, in Intimate Betrayal (1999). In Love & Basketball (2000), she portrayed Kerry, a girlfriend of the basketball playing protagonist. In 2002, Calhoun appeared in Trois 2: Pandora's Box as psychologist Dr. Mia DuBois and portrayed Wet in Civil Brand. Calhoun played Rachel in the Western Gang of Roses (2003).

Calhoun portrayed Mia, the wife of Morris Chestnut's character, in The Best Man (1999). She received an NAACP Image Award nomination for Outstanding Actress in a Motion Picture in 2000 for her performance. She returned in its sequel The Best Man Holiday (2013). In the latter, Mia is terminally ill and dies at the end of the film. 

She played the role of Brenda in 2007's The Salon starring Vivica Fox. In 2009, Robert Townsend directed Calhoun in Diary of a Single Mom, Season I, II and III (2008–10). Calhoun appeared as Patricia Tresvant, Ralph's mother in The New Edition Story miniseries  which aired on the BET network in January 2017.

Personal
Calhoun gave birth to a son in 2000. Her son is also blind.

Filmography

Film and TV Movies

Television

References

External links
 
 

1971 births
American film actresses
American television actresses
Living people
American child actresses
20th-century American actresses
Actresses from Los Angeles
21st-century American actresses
Actresses from Pennsylvania
African-American actresses
Actresses from Philadelphia
Los Angeles County High School for the Arts alumni
20th-century African-American people
20th-century African-American women